A Quiet Storm is the 1975 third solo album by American soul singer, songwriter, and producer Smokey Robinson. The album received generally positive reviews, and spawned the hit single "Baby That's Backatcha", which spent one week at the top of the Billboard Hot Soul Singles chart.

According to Pitchfork journalist Eric Harvey, A Quiet Storm revitalized Robinson's career after having left his group the Miracles, and typified what would become known as the quiet storm radio format.

Critical reception

A Quiet Storm is one of the most highly-acclaimed soul albums of the 1970s. The album spawned three hit singles, including Robinson's first disco hit "Baby That's Backatcha", rising to number 7 on the Billboard Disco chart (Top 10 R&B). The album re-established Robinson's reputation as a songwriter and producer and solidified his solo success after leaving his influential group, the Miracles.

In a contemporary review for Rolling Stone, Robert Palmer said A Quiet Storm proved Robinson was "still a dynamic creative force" as it succeeded on the strength of his singing and production, although he highlighted the "sexy directness" of the title track and "Baby That's Backatcha". Vince Aletti ranked it as the year's third best album in his ballot for the 1975 Pazz & Jop critics poll. Robert Christgau was less enthusiastic, believing the title track was somewhat bold for concentrating Pure Smokeys "drift into a style", but finding much of the record lacking rhythm, with the exception of "Love Letters" and "Coincidentally".

A Quiet Storm was later named one of the greatest Motown albums of all time in a 1999 edition of Q. According to Pitchfork journalist Eric Harvey, the record reinvented Robinson's brand of "contemplative romantic soul" with the Miracles, revitalized his career after two underperforming solo albums, and typified what would become known as the quiet storm radio format.

Miracles member Marv Tarplin was also a contributor to this album.

Track listing
All tracks composed and arranged by Smokey Robinson; except where indicated.

 "Quiet Storm" 7:47 (Robinson, Rose Ella Jones [Robinson's real-life sister])
 "The Agony and the Ecstasy" 4:46
 "Baby That's Backatcha" 3:36
 "Wedding Song" 3:20
 "Happy" – Love Theme from Lady Sings the Blues (Robinson, Michel Legrand) 7:05
 "Love Letters" 4:04
 "Coincidentally" 4:22

The "Wedding Song" was originally composed for the wedding of Jermaine and Hazel Joy Jackson December 15, 1973.

Personnel
Smokey Robinson – lead vocals
Melba Bradford – backing vocals
Joseph A. Brown, Jr. – drums, percussion
Carmen Bryant – backing vocals
Gary Coleman – percussion
Shawn Furlong, Terry Furlong – sound effects, sopranino
Michael Jacobsen – electric cello
Gene Pello – drums
James "Alibe" Sledge – bongos, congas, backing vocals
Fred Smith – horns, woodwind
Russ Turner – musical arrangements, keyboards, backing vocals
Marv Tarplin – guitar
Technical
Greg Venable, Russ Terrana - mixing engineer
Katarina Pettersson - art direction
Jim Britt - photography

Charts

Weekly charts

Year-end charts

Singles

References

External links
 Smokey Robinson-A Quiet Storm at Discogs

1975 albums
Smokey Robinson albums
Albums produced by Smokey Robinson
Tamla Records albums
Concept albums
Quiet storm albums